Hallowe'en Party  is a work of detective fiction by British writer Agatha Christie, first published in the UK by the Collins Crime Club in November 1969 and in the US by Dodd, Mead and Company later in the same year. The UK edition retailed for twenty-five shillings. In preparation for decimalisation on 15 February 1971, it was also priced on the dustjacket at £1.25. The US edition retailed at $5.95.

The novel features Belgian detective Hercule Poirot and the mystery novelist Ariadne Oliver, who begins the novel in attendance at a Hallowe'en party. A girl at the party claims she witnessed a murder, which, at the time, she was too young to realize was a murder. Soon, the girl herself is found murdered, and Oliver calls in Poirot. This book was dedicated to P. G. Wodehouse.

A review at the time of publication and another 20 years later both felt this story was not one of Agatha Christie's best, 'a disappointment', a novel littered with loose ends and unrealized characters.

Plot summary
When everyone is preparing games and decorations for a Hallowe'en party held at Rowena Drake's home in Woodleigh Common, thirteen-year-old Joyce Reynolds tells everyone attending she had once seen a murder, but had not realised it was one until later. When the party ends, Joyce is found dead, having been drowned in an apple-bobbing tub. Ariadne Oliver, attending the party while visiting her friend Judith Butler, calls on Hercule Poirot to investigate the murder and Joyce's claim. With help from retired Superintendent Spence, Poirot makes a list of deaths and disappearances for the last few years in Woodleigh Common: 

• Rowena's aunt, Mrs Llewellyn-Smythe, died suddenly, and her au pair Olga Seminoff disappeared, when a codicil that favoured her in her employer's will was found to be a forgery.

• Leslie Ferrier, a lawyer's clerk, was stabbed in the back by an unknown assailant.

• Charlotte Benfield, a sixteen-year-old shop assistant, was found dead with multiple head injuries.

• Janet White, a teacher at Elms School, was strangled to death.

Poirot learns a few interesting facts:

• Judith's daughter Miranda was Joyce's closest friend, and the pair shared secrets between them,

• Joyce was known to be a teller of tales to gain attention,

• Elizabeth Whittaker -a mathematics teacher attending the party- witnessed Rowena become startled and drop a glass vase of water outside the door of the library while the party-goers were playing snapdragon,

• Ferrier had previous convictions for forgery, and many suspected that he and Olga were working together to steal Mrs Llewellyn-Smythe's fortune,

• A one-time cleaner of Mrs Llewellyn-Smythe had been witness to her employer making the codicil,

• A beautiful garden built within an abandoned quarry was designed by Michael Garfield, a man with narcissistic behaviour for Mrs Llewellyn-Smythe,

• The victim's brother, Leopold Reynolds, has become flush with money of late.

Leopold is later found dead, having been drowned in a small brook. Rowena, very upset about the death, informs Poirot she had seen him in the library the night of the party, and believes he witnessed his sister's killer.

Poirot soon has a theory, and advises the police to search the woods near the quarry. The search turns up Olga's body in an abandoned well, having been stabbed in the same manner as Ferrier. Fearing another murder, Poirot sends a telegram to Mrs Oliver, instructing her to take Judith and her daughter to London as quickly as possible. However, Miranda disappears when the group stops for lunch, and meets up with Garfield, who takes her to a pagan sacrificial altar with the intention of poisoning her. However, he commits suicide when two men, recruited by Poirot to trail Miranda, thwart him and save her life. Once in safety, Miranda reveals that she had witnessed the murder Joyce claimed she had seen; more precisely, she saw Garfield and Rowena drag Olga's body through the quarry garden and only later realized she had witnessed a murder. Miranda had not been present at the preparations for the party, having been ill, so Joyce tried to seek famous Ariadne's attention by claiming she herself had seen the murder.

Poirot tells Mrs Oliver what he has learned. While her husband was alive, Rowena began an affair with Garfield. Her aunt discovered this, and as a punishment, she wrote a codicil that left her fortune to Olga. When the pair learnt of this, they plotted to discredit Olga's claim, hiring Ferrier to replace the real codicil with a clumsy forgery that could be easily spotted, ensuring Rowena inherited everything as stipulated in earlier wills; the real codicil was not destroyed and later found. Both Olga and Ferrier were murdered to conceal the deceit, though Rowena suspected someone had witnessed the disposal of Olga's body. She killed Joyce when she claimed she had witnessed a murder, unaware that she had appropriated Miranda's story as her own. The dropping of the vase of water which Mrs Whittaker witnessed, was to disguise the fact Rowena was already wet from drowning Joyce. Leopold was murdered because he had witnessed Rowena murdering his sister and subsequently blackmailed her.

With his theory, Poirot muses that Rowena would likely have shared a similar fate to Olga, as Garfield's motivation for the murder was his narcissistic desire to construct another perfect garden with Rowena's money; he would have had no further need of her, as she had already provided him with a Greek island she had secretly purchased. Poirot reveals further that Garfield was Miranda's father; Judith is not a widow, but a single mother. She had met Garfield years before, and encountered him by accident when settling in the area with Miranda. While Garfield knew Miranda was his daughter, he was willing to kill his own child to ensure he could create another garden. Satisfied with his help, Judith thanks Poirot and leaves.

The story ends with a few questions unanswered, including whether Mr Drake's death was an accident, and if the police took Mrs Drake to trial.

Characters
 Hercule Poirot - Belgian detective, asked to help investigate the murder of Joyce Reynolds by his friend Oliver.
 Ariadne Oliver - crime fiction writer and Poirot's friend. She attends the Halloween party that Joyce is killed during, while visiting a friend in the area. 
 Inspector Timothy Raglan - the investigating officer into Joyce's murder.
 Alfred Richmond - Chief Constable of the local police.
 Dr Ferguson - local physician and the appointed police surgeon.
 Joyce Reynolds - first victim of the case. A thirteen-year-old girl attending Rowena's Halloween party. Declared she once saw a murder, which becomes the focal point of the investigation.
 Olga Seminoff - an au pair girl from Herzegovina. Was in service to Mrs Llewellyn-Smythe in her last years, but has since disappeared following her employer's death and the reading of her will.
 Mrs Llewellyn-Smythe - wealthy widow. Died two years before the novel begins. One of the possible deaths considered as the murder witnessed by Joyce.
 Leslie Ferrier - local solicitor's clerk, murdered before the start of the novel. One of the possible deaths considered as the murder witnessed by Joyce.
 Janet White - a local teacher, dead from strangulation before the start of the novel. One of the possible deaths considered as the murder witnessed by Joyce.
 Leopold Reynolds - second victim of the case. Joyce's younger brother. Attended the Halloween party, and later found to be blackmailing the killer.
 Rowena Drake - Mrs Llewellyn-Smythe's niece. A widow following the death of her husband Hugo, also her first cousin, from unknown causes. Organiser of the Halloween party that Joyce attended.
 Miranda Butler - a twelve-year-old girl who was ill and unable to attend the party. Best friends of Joyce, both of whom are students at the local school.
 Judith Butler - Mrs Oliver's friend, and mother of Miranda.
 Ann Reynolds - Joyce's and Leopold's older sister.
 Mrs Reynolds - Joyce's and Leopold's mother.
 Michael Garfield - a landscape gardener, recently returned to the area. Noted for being unusually beautiful and fascinated with beauty itself.
 Elizabeth Whittaker - a teacher of mathematics and Latin at The Elms school. Attended the Halloween party, and was an associate of Janet White.
 Miss Emlyn - local headmistress of The Elms school.
 Mrs Goodbody - local cleaning woman, attending the party in the role of a witch.
 Jeremy Fullerton - Mrs Llewellyn-Smythe's solicitor, and the employer of Ferrier.
 Nicholas Ransom - an eighteen-year-old, who attended the party. Was a part of the game where the girls see the faces of their future husbands.
 Desmond Holland - a sixteen-year-old, who attended the party. Was part of the game where the girls see the faces of their future husbands.
 Harriet Leaman - Mrs Llewellyn-Smythe's former cleaner.
 George - Poirot's faithful valet.
 Superintendent Spence - a retired police officer. Assists Poirot by supplying a list of deaths with a connection to Joyce's declaration.
 Elspeth McKay - Superintendent Spence's sister.

Dedication
The novel is dedicated: "To P. G. Wodehouse — whose books and stories have brightened my life for many years. Also, to show my pleasure in his having been kind enough to tell me he enjoyed my books."

Literary significance and reception
Robert Weaver in the Toronto Daily Star of 13 December 1969 said, "Hallowe'en Party...is a disappointment, but with all her accomplishments Miss Christie can be forgiven some disappointments...Poirot seems weary and so does the book."

Robert Barnard: "Bobbing for apples turns serious when ghastly child is extinguished in the bucket. The plot of this late one is not too bad, but the telling is very poor: it is littered with loose ends, unrealised characters, and maintains only a marginal hold on the reader's interest. Much of it reads as if spoken into a tape-recorder and never read through afterward."

References and allusions

References to other works
 Superintendent Spence brought to Poirot the case solved in Mrs McGinty's Dead and which they discuss in Chapter 5. The case is also recollected by Poirot in Chapter 3, when Poirot recalls Mrs. Oliver getting out of a car and "a bag of apples breaking". This is a reference to her second appearance in Mrs McGinty's Dead, Chapter 10.
 Miss Emlyn mentions in Chapter 10 that she knows of Poirot from Miss Bulstrode, who previously appeared as a character in Cat Among the Pigeons.
 When Joyce mentions to Ariadne Oliver in Chapter 1 that she should have themed the party around a fake murder in honour of her presence, Ariadne replies ‘never again’. This is a reference to Dead Man's Folly, an earlier Poirot novel where she is asked to write a fake murder for a charity fête that turns into a real one.
 A letter was sent to Hercule Poirot from Mr Goby, who appeared in The Mystery of the Blue Train, After the Funeral, and Third Girl.
 Mrs Rowena Drake is compared to Lady Macbeth by Poirot, while Michael Garfield titles his sketch of Miranda as Iphigenia, reflecting his plan.
 Mrs Goodbody, a rich source of local insight, uses a well-known children's rhyme to express her view of the likely fate of Olga, when Poirot asks her in Chapter 16: Ding dong dell, pussy's in the well.

References to actual history, geography and current science
 The first half of the novel contains several discussions in which anxiety is voiced about the criminal justice system in Great Britain. This in part reflects the abolition in 1965 of capital punishment for murder.
 The novel reflects in many respects its time of publication at the end of the permissive 1960s, but nowhere more so than when a character uses the word "lesbian" in Chapter 15.
 Mrs Llewellyn-Smythe placed her codicil in a book titled Enquire Within upon Everything, a real book of domestic tips published from 1856 to 1994.

Publication history
 1969, Collins Crime Club (London), November 1969, Hardback, 256 pp
 1969, Dodd Mead and Company (New York), 1969, Hardback, 248 pp
 1970, Pocket Books (New York), Paperback, 185 pp
 1972, Fontana Books (Imprint of HarperCollins), Paperback, 189 pp
 1987, Ulverscroft Large-print Edition, Hardcover, 
 2009, HarperCollins; Facsimile edition, Hardcover: 256 pages, 

The novel was first serialised in the weekly magazine Woman's Own in seven abridged instalments from 15 November to 27 December 1969, illustrated with uncredited photographic montages.

In the US, the novel appeared in the December 1969 issue of Cosmopolitan magazine.

Adaptations

Radio
Hallowe'en Party was adapted for radio and broadcast on BBC Radio 4 on 30 October 1993, featuring John Moffatt as Hercule Poirot, with Stephanie Cole as Ariadne Oliver.

Television
British 
The novel was adapted as part of the twelfth series of Agatha Christie's Poirot with David Suchet, with Zoë Wanamaker reprising her role as Ariadne Oliver. Guest stars include Deborah Findlay as Rowena Drake, Julian Rhind-Tutt as Michael Garfield, Amelia Bullmore as Judith Butler, and Fenella Woolgar as Elizabeth Whittaker. Charles Palmer (who also directed The Clocks for the series) directs this instalment, with the screenplay written by Mark Gatiss (who wrote the screenplay for Cat Among the Pigeons; he also appeared as a guest star in the adaptation of Appointment with Death).

The television adaptation shifted the late 1960s setting to the 1930s, as with nearly all shows in this series. Other specific changes include:

 Omitted from the adaptation are the characters of Ann Reynolds, Superintendent Spence, Alfred Richmond, Elspeth McKay, Miss Emlyn, Harriet Leaman, Dr Ferguson, Mr Goby, Nicholas Ransom, and Desmond Holland, along with the location of The Elms School, and the investigation into Charlotte Benfield's death.
 Reverend Mr Cottrell and Frances and Edmund Drake are new characters to the story – Cottrell ran a program that supplied au pairs, including Olga, which went downhill when Olga disappeared; Frances and Edmund are Rowena's children, with Frances having been involved in a relationship with Leslie Ferrier
 The garden in the novel is changed from being built in an abandoned quarry, to being a part of the estate owned by Rowena.
 Mrs Goodbody is more involved in the story – she is consulted by Poirot over deaths that happened over the past few years, that could have been murders witnessed by Joyce.
 Certain events and clues were changed – Joyce's appropriation of stories is revealed by Cottrell; Mrs Oliver witnesses Rowena purposely dropping the vase of water near the library; Oliver is bedridden for most of the case following the party, until the end; the fake codicil is revealed by Mr Fullerton, while the real one is found in a picture frame in Lesley's possession; Leopold's body is found by Elizabeth Whittaker, and the scene visited by Poirot; Rowena comes to Poirot twice, before and after Leopold's murder, to give false reasons for her dropping the vase and where he was during the party.
 Janet White's first name is changed to Beatrice, and her death was a result of suicide by drowning, due to personal issues–she could not deal with people commenting about her sexuality, and so decided to end it all, leaving a note to Whittaker, who had loved her. Whittaker hid the note to prevent Janet being given an unconsecrated grave.
 A major number of changes were made for the final scene, including the denouement: 
 Judith and Miranda are not taken away by Poirot, but Miranda sneaks out of her mother's home to meet Garfield.
 Garfield is caught by the police while trying to kill Miranda in a pagan fashion at the garden, and does not kill himself with poison.
 Olga's body is found after the arrest of Garfield and Rowena. There is no well or knife found with it. The motive for her murder was modified – Garfield was not her lover, whilst Rowena was confronted about the codicil, as Olga knew she must have had it switched for a fake one and knew she was having an affair with Garfield. Her body was buried by Garfield only, witnessed by Miranda who was visiting the garden at the time of Olga's murder.
 The death of Rowena's husband is explained in the adaptation as being murder, committed by Garfield for Rowena and blamed on young tearaways.
 Rowena learns from Garfield the truth, in that he was only interested in the money and making a new garden, never loving her, and thus quickly hates him as a result.

French 
The novel was adapted as a 2014 episode of the French television series Les Petits Meurtres d'Agatha Christie.

Graphic novel
Hallowe'en Party was released by HarperCollins as a graphic novel adaptation on 3 November 2008, adapted and illustrated by "Chandre".

Film
In 2022, it was announced Kenneth Branagh would adapt the book into his third Hercule Poirot film, retitled as A Haunting in Venice, following his previous Poirot adaptations, Murder on the Orient Express (2017) and Death on the Nile (2022), which also starred Branagh as Poirot.

References

External links
Hallowe'en Party at the official Agatha Christie website
Hallowe'en Party at the new official Agatha Christie website

1969 British novels
Collins Crime Club books
Halloween novels
Hercule Poirot novels
British novels adapted into television shows
Novels first published in serial form
Novels set in the 1960s
Novels set in the United Kingdom
Works originally published in Woman's Own
Fiction about child murder